The Basque surname Duhalde can refer to:

 Alfredo Duhalde, ex-provisional Chilean president
 Eduardo Duhalde, Argentine president
 Hilda de Duhalde, Argentine Senator
 Jean-Baptiste Du Halde
 Margot Duhalde (1920-2018), Chilean pilot

Basque-language surnames